WidgetCo, Inc. is an e-commerce and manufacturing company headquartered in Houston, Texas, United States. WidgetCo products have been featured by Better Homes and Gardens and Gawker Media. WidgetCo manufactures and distributes metal, plastic, cork, rubber and wood products to businesses and individuals worldwide.

Services
The company is involved in the upcycling of wine closures. WidgetCo offers bulk wine corks to consumers and crafters.

References

External links

Companies based in Houston
Retail companies of the United States
Wine packaging and storage